"Holding Her and Loving You" is a song written by Walt Aldridge and Tom Brasfield and recorded by American country music artist Earl Thomas Conley. It was released in August 1983 as the second single from the album Don't Make It Easy for Me. The song was Conley's fourth number one country single.

Commercial performance
The single went to number one for one week and spent a total of fourteen weeks on the country chart. Since it became available for download, the song has sold 156,000 copies as of April 2019.

Music video
A music video for the song was released and has been seen on GAC.

Covers
In 1998, Clay Walker charted a live recording of this song, reaching number 68 on the same chart.

Chart performance

References

1983 singles
1983 songs
Earl Thomas Conley songs
Clay Walker songs
Songs written by Walt Aldridge
RCA Records singles
Songs written by Tom Brasfield